Doug Petersen (born November 28, 1969) is a former Canadian football defensive lineman in the Canadian Football League who played for the BC Lions, Montreal Alouettes and Edmonton Eskimos. He played for the Simon Fraser Clan.

References

1969 births
Living people
Canadian football defensive linemen
BC Lions players
Montreal Alouettes players
Edmonton Elks players
Simon Fraser Clan football players